Niala (also Romanized as Nīālā and Neyālā; also known as Hīāla and Netālā) is a village in Tuskacheshmeh Rural District, in the Central District of Galugah County, Mazandaran Province, Iran. At the 2006 census, its population was 381, in 107 families.

References 

Populated places in Galugah County